Pierre Lecomte du Noüy (20 December 1883, Paris – 22 September 1947, New York City) was a French biophysicist and philosopher.  He is probably best remembered by scientists for his work on the surface tension, and other properties, of liquids.

Life and work 

Du Noüy was a descendant of the French dramatist Pierre Corneille. His mother wrote many novels, one of which, Amitié Amoureuse, was translated into 16 languages and ran for 600 editions in France. Born and educated in France, du Noüy obtained the degrees of LL.B., Ph.B., Sc.B., Ph.D., and Sc.D.

He was an associate member of the Rockefeller Institute working in Alexis Carrel's lab from 1920 through 1928, head for 10 years of the biophysics division of the Pasteur Institute, and the author of some 200 published papers.

He invented the Tensiometer, a scientific apparatus that used his du Noüy ring method to measure the surface tension of liquids.

Du Noüy believed that mankind should have confidence in science, but be aware that we know less about the material world than is commonly believed.

Telefinalism

Du Noüy converted from agnosticism to Christianity. He supported a theistic and teleological interpretation of evolution. In his book Human Destiny he wrote that biological evolution continues to a spiritual and moral plane. Du Noüy met Pierre Teilhard de Chardin who shared similar interests in evolution and spirituality.

Du Noüy developed his own hypothesis of orthogenesis known as "telefinalism". According to Du Noüy evolution could not occur by chance alone and that on an average since "the beginning of the world it has followed an ascending path, always oriented in the same direction." He accepted naturalistic evolutionary mechanisms such as mutation and natural selection but believed science could not explain all evolutionary phenomena or the origin of life. According to his telefinalist hypothesis a transcendent cause which he equated with God is directing the evolutionary process.

His "telefinalist" hypothesis was criticized by Carl Hempel, Leo Koch and George Gaylord Simpson as nonscientific.<ref>Koch, Leo (1957). "Vitalistic-Mechanistic Controversy", The Scientific Monthly',' Vol. 85, No. 5, pp. 245–255.</ref>

PublicationsBetween Knowing and Believing (1967)The Road to Reason (1948)Human Destiny (1947)
 Biological Time (1937)An Interfacial Tensiometer for Universal Use (1925). The Journal of General Physiology. Volume 7, issue 5, pp. 625–633

Quotes

 See also 
 Du Noüy ring method

 References 

 Further reading 

 
George Nauman Shuster, Ralph E. Thorson (1970). Evolution in Perspective: Commentaries in Honor of Pierre Lecomte du Noüy''. University of Notre Dame Press.

External links 

 Papers of Pierre Lecomte du Noüy (Pasteur Institute)
   Papers of Pierre Lecomte du Noüy at The University of Arizona

1883 births
1947 deaths
20th-century French male writers
20th-century French philosophers
French male non-fiction writers
Orthogenesis
Philosophical cosmologists
Theistic evolutionists
Academic staff of the University of Paris